The National University of Lanús (UNLA) is an Argentine national university, located in Remedios de Escalada, Lanús Partido, Buenos Aires Province.

It was created on June 7, 1995 by national law .

History 

The university was created on June 7, 1995 by national law .  It first operated in La Habana 568, Valentín Alsina, in a building loaned by the Federation of Meat.

In 2003, national law 25,766 granted the university a  building, which at that moment housed the Ferrocarriles Argentinos archives.

See also
Science and Education in Argentina
Argentine Higher Education Official Site 
 Argentine Universities

Notes

Lanus
Educational institutions established in 1995
Universities in Buenos Aires Province
1995 establishments in Argentina